Life'll Kill Ya is the tenth studio album by American singer-songwriter Warren Zevon. The album was released on January 25, 2000, by Artemis Records. It was later hailed in Rolling Stone as his best work since Excitable Boy.

Themes
Several of the album's songs deal with the topic of death; for instance, "My Shit's Fucked Up" is a mournful lament on the aging process and the inevitable decay that accompanies it. "Life'll Kill Ya" and "Don't Let Us Get Sick" also have prominent death themes. Additionally, Zevon had a phobia of doctors leading him to avoid them for several years; that theme is included in the album as well. In 2002, just two years after the album's release, Zevon was diagnosed with mesothelioma and died a year later.

Track listing

Note
On some releases, track 9 is omitted from the rear U-card but appears on the song list in the case booklet.

Personnel
Warren Zevon – percussion, keyboards, guitar, piccolo, vocals, penny whistle, harmonica; theremin on "Porcelain Monkey"
Jorge Calderón – bass guitar, percussion, vocals
Dennis Collins – vocals on "Fistful of Rain"
Babi Floyd – vocals on "Fistful of Rain"
Curtis King – vocals on "Fistful of Rain"
Chuck Prophet – guitar on "For My Next Trick I'll Need a Volunteer"
Jim Ryan – mandolin on "Ourselves to Know"
Winston Watson – percussion, snare drums

Production
Paul Q. Kolderie – producer, engineer
Sean Slade – producer, engineer
Greg Calbi – mastering
 Michael Krumper – A&R
 Warren Zevon – art direction
Jonathan Exley – photography, design

Charts

References

Warren Zevon albums
2000 albums
Albums produced by Sean Slade
Albums produced by Paul Q. Kolderie
Artemis Records albums